Home in San Antone is a 1949 American Western musical film directed by Ray Nazarro, and starring Roy Acuff, The Smoky Mountain Boys, The Modernaires, Doye O'Dell, Lyn Thomas, and Bill Edwards. The film was released by Columbia Pictures on April 15, 1949.

Cast
Roy Acuff as Roy Acuff aka Jack Jones
The Smoky Mountain Boys as Roy Acuff Band
The Modernaires as Vocal Quintet
Doye O'Dell as Radio Singer
Lyn Thomas as June Wallace (as Jacqueline Thomas)
Bill Edwards as Ted Gibson
George Cleveland as Grandpa Gibson
Lloyd Corrigan as Uncle Zeke Tinker
William Frawley as O'Fleery
Fred F. Sears as Rado Announcer Breezy (as Fred Sears)
Dorothy Vaughan as Ma Gibson
Ivan Triesault as Jewel Thief
Matt Willis as Jewel Thief Thorg
Sam Flint as Dan Wallace
Eddie Acuff as Postman (uncredited)
Slim Duncan as Fiddle Player (uncredited)
Ralph Dunn as Cop at Road Block (uncredited)
Peggy Leon as Middle Aged Woman (uncredited)
Lee Phelps as Police Captain (uncredited)
Bertha Priestley as Fat Woman (uncredited)
Rudy Sooter as Musician (uncredited)
Robert B. Williams as Arresting Officer (uncredited)

References

External links

1940s Western (genre) musical films
American Western (genre) musical films
1949 films
American black-and-white films
Columbia Pictures films
Films directed by Ray Nazarro
1940s American films